Beyond Eagle and Swastika: German Nationalism Since 1945 is a book by Kurt P. Tauber.  It is a history and analysis of (and a reference work on) anti-democratic nationalism in postwar Germany.  It was completed in 1963 after ten years of research. Wesleyan University Press, of Middletown, Connecticut, published it in two volumes (spanning 1,598 pages) in 1967.

Reception
Beyond Eagle and Swastika was called "a monumental work" by Louis Leo Snyder in a review for The Annals of the American Academy of Political and Social Science. Gordon A. Craig said that it was a "scholarly tour de force" in a review comparing it to Ferenc A. Váli's The Quest for a United Germany.

References

External links
Beyond Eagle and Swastika on WorldCat

1967 non-fiction books
American non-fiction books
Books about nationalism
Books about politics of Germany
Books about the far right
Wesleyan University Press books